Voso or VOSO may refer to:

Vanadyl sulfate (VOSO4), a well known inorganic compound of vanadium
Ose (demon)